Andrés Felipe Colorado Sánchez (born 1 December 1998) is a Colombian professional footballer who plays as a defensive midfielder for Partizan, and for the Colombia national team. He is the older brother of Jean Colorado (Platense).

International goals

References

External links
 

1998 births
Living people
Colombian footballers
Colombia international footballers
Association football midfielders
Cortuluá footballers
Deportivo Cali footballers
São Paulo FC players
FK Partizan players
Colombian expatriate footballers
Colombian expatriate sportspeople in Brazil
Expatriate footballers in Brazil
Colombian expatriate sportspeople in Serbia
Expatriate footballers in Serbia
Categoría Primera A players
Categoría Primera B players
Sportspeople from Valle del Cauca Department